The Totally Accurate Controller MK2 (TAC-2), manufactured by Suncom Technologies, is an Atari 2600 compatible joystick, commonly used with the Commodore 64 and Amiga computers in the mid to late 1980s.  It has two smaller siblings, the Slik Stik and StarFighter, which are built in a similar fashion.  The joystick's square base came in two colours, black or cream.

Features:
 One 8-way stick (4 digital switches)
 Two fire buttons (wired in parallel as button 1; indistinguishable in software)

Technical features:
 TAC-2 has no microswitches. Instead, it uses a metal ball that short-circuits contacts around the bottom shaft of the controller.
 The fire buttons in the original version work with brass contact plates which tend to become oxidized and thus need care every now and then.
 9-pin Atari style connector (DE-9 connector)
 The handle is a customized tyre valve (TR-418) with a chrome sleeve, which gives the TAC-2 its special characteristics.

A cost reduced version was released, in which the tyre valve was skipped.  Instead, a white rubber gasket held a black plastic tube, the shafted metal ball inside was simply plugged into it (not screwed as the original version), and the brass plates in the buttons were replaced with the wire of the redesigned button return spring.  It is mainly recognized by its shiny plastic stick instead of the chrome valve sleeve and deeper red buttons instead of the original orange.

References

External links

The Vintage Joystick Museum

Joysticks